Tatlı or Tatly or Tatlu may refer to:

 Tatlı, Agstafa, Azerbaijan
 Tatlı, Samukh, Azerbaijan
 Tatlı, Sungurlu